Acute Misfortune is a 2018 Australian drama film co-written, directed and produced by Thomas M. Wright. The story is based on Sydney journalist Erik Jensen's biography of Australian artist Adam Cullen, who died at the age of 46, and stars Daniel Henshall as Adam Cullen.

Plot
The plot tells part of the story of the deeply troubled award-winning artist Adam Cullen's life (1965–2012), specifically his relationship with his biographer, Erik Jensen, as it descends into a dependent and abusive relationship.

Cast
Daniel Henshall as Adam Cullen
Toby Wallace as Erik Jensen
Gillian Jones as Ruth Marr
Genevieve Lemon as Carmel Cullen
Max Cullen as Kevin Cullen
Daniel Aguiar as Portuguese man
Christopher Clift as the grieving father
James Bell as Ben
Rowland Holmes as a policeman
Steve Mouzakis as Jim
Joanne Samuel as the magistrate

Themes
The focus of the film is on the complex relationship between the artist and his biographer, and Wright said that he had wanted to make the film "full of beauty, full of possibility...[with] A lightness, an accessibility and an honesty". He rejects the bio-pic moniker, and says that he did not set out to make a biography, nor a "faithful transcription of the book"; he wanted to question the book.

Production
The film was based on Jensen's 2015 biography of Cullen, Acute Misfortune: The Life and Death of Adam Cullen. The book won the 2015 Nib Literary Award as well as being shortlisted for the Walkley Book Award and the Victorian Premier's Prize for Nonfiction. Wright co-wrote the screenplay with Jensen.

Authenticity was important to Wright: Henshall lost  during the making of the film, wore Cullen's clothes, painted with his paints and paintbrushes, worked closely with Cullen's assistant, and met many of Cullen's friends, caregivers, former partners and lawyers.

Wright co-produced the film with Virginia Kay, Jamie Houge and Liz Kearney. Luca Capelli edited the film, Germain McMicking and Stefan Duscio were the directors of photography, Leah Popple production designer and Robert Connolly executive producer. Evelyn Ida Morris wrote the score.

Release
The film premiered at the Melbourne International Film Festival (MIFF) in August 2018, and played at the Adelaide Film Festival in October that year. It was also shown at the 2018 Brisbane International Film Festival and the 2019 Edinburgh International Film Festival.

It was released in Australian cinemas in May 2019, starting with question and answer sessions at selected cinemas.

Critical response
Acute Misfortune received a five star review and was named the best Australian film of 2019 by The Guardian,. It was later named one of The Guardian'''s "10 Best Australian Films of the decade 2010–2020" The Hollywood Reporter called Acute Misfortune "one of the year's most striking and accomplished directorial debuts".

The film received The Age Critics' Prize at Melbourne International Film Festival and was nominated for the 2019 AACTA Award for Best Independent Film. It was given a "Notable mention" (along with Sweet Country) in The Monthly Awards 2018, and Screen Daily'' called it an "overlooked gem" in their list of the Best Films of the year. Wright is nominated in the Best Director (Feature Film) category for Acute Misfortune at the 2020 Australian Directors' Guild Awards.

For his work, Henshall was nominated for the 2019 Film Critics Circle of Australia Award for Best Actor and 2020 Australian Film Critics Association Award for Best Actor. The score, by Evelyn Ida Morris, was nominated for best soundtrack at the 2018 ARIA Music Awards.

References

External links

2018 films
Australian biographical drama films
Australian films based on actual events
2018 biographical drama films
2010s English-language films